The 2005–06 New Zealand Figure Skating Championships was held in Dunedin from 26 through 30 September 2005. Skaters competed in the disciplines of men's singles and ladies' singles across many levels, including senior, junior, novice, adult, and the pre-novice disciplines of juvenile, pre-primary, primary, and intermediate.

Senior results

Men

Ladies

External links
 2005–06 New Zealand Figure Skating Championships results

2005 in figure skating
New Zealand Figure Skating Championships
Figure Skating
September 2005 sports events in New Zealand